The Prague Spring International Music Festival (commonly , Prague Spring) is a classical music festival held every year in Prague, Czech Republic, with symphony orchestras and chamber music ensembles from around the world.

The first festival was held in 1946 under the patronage of Czechoslovak president Edvard Beneš, and its organizing committee was made up of important figures in Czech musical life. In that year, the Czech Philharmonic Orchestra was celebrating its fiftieth anniversary and was therefore granted to appear in all of the orchestral concerts. The project was initiated by Rafael Kubelík, chief conductor of the orchestra at the time. Such musicians as Karel Ančerl, Leonard Bernstein, Sir Adrian Boult, Rudolf Firkušný, Jaroslav Krombholc, Rafael Kubelík, Moura Lympany, Yevgeny Mravinsky, Charles Münch, Ginette Neveu, Jarmila Novotná, Lev Oborin, David Oistrakh, Ken-Ichiro Kobayashi and Jan Panenka have appeared at the festival. Since 1952, the festival has opened on 12 May, the anniversary of the death of Bedřich Smetana, with his cycle of symphonic poems Má vlast (My Country), and it used to close (until 2003) with Ludwig van Beethoven's Symphony No. 9.

The festival commemorates important musical anniversaries by including works by the composers concerned on its programmes, and presents Czech as well as world premieres of compositions by contemporary authors. Artists and orchestras who performed at the festival include Sviatoslav Richter, Lorin Maazel, Herbert von Karajan, Mstislav Rostropovich, Julian Lloyd Webber, Boris Pergamenschikow, Lucia Popp, Kim Borg, Sir Colin Davis, Maurice André, Dmitry Sitkovetsky, Leonid Kogan, Paul Klecki, Gustav Leonhardt, Anne-Sophie Mutter, Giovanni Bellucci, Alfred Brendel, Heinrich Schiff, Leopold Stokowski, Arthur Honegger, Arthur Rubinstein and Gennady Rozhdestvensky.

Prague Spring's traditional venue is the Rudolfinum concert hall, a neo-renaissance building situated on the bank of the Vltava River. It is complemented by Prague's ornate Municipal House, which has a larger seating capacity.

The Prague Spring has a particular focus on supporting younger performers. The Prague Spring International Music Competition was established just one year after the festival itself and is held each year in various instrumental sections. The list of past winners of competition includes Mstislav Rostropovich, Saša Večtomov, Natalia Gutman, James Galway and Maurice Bourgue.

Competitions disciplines and Laureates 

Piano: Giovanni Bellucci, Martin Kasík, Ivo Kahánek
Organ: Václav Rabas, Aleš Bárta, Martin Sander, Jaroslav Tůma
Violin: Ivan Štraus, Bohuslav Matoušek, Ivan Ženatý, Petr Messiereur
Cello: Mstislav Rostropovich
Trumpet: Vladislav Kozderka, Vladimír Rejlek
Trombone: Nicolas Moutier, Carl Lenthe
Flute: Jean Ferrandis, Andrea Lieberknecht, Tatjana Ruhland, Dora Seres, Denis Bouriakov, Yubeen Kim, Chaeyeon You
French Horn: Radek Baborák
Basson: Luboš Hucek, Václav Vonášek
Oboe: Liběna Séquardtová
Singing: Dagmar Pecková, Štefan Margita, Magda Ianculescu
Harpsichord: Jean Rondeau, Anastasia Antonova
Conducting: Charles Olivieri-Munroe, Pierre-Michel Durand

The age limit for candidates is 30 years.

See also
 Designblok

References

Bibliography
 Antonín Matzner a kol.: Šedesát pražských jar. Togga: Praha, 2006.

External links 
 Prague Spring — International Music Festival
 The first Prague Spring International Cello Competition in 1950 in photographs, documents and reminiscences
Prague Spring International Music Festival 
 List of all flute competition laureates 

Music in Prague
Classical music festivals in the Czech Republic
Festivals in Prague
1946 establishments in Czechoslovakia
Music festivals established in 1946
Spring (season) events in the Czech Republic